World Editions (WE) is an independent publishing house that focuses on bringing Dutch and international literature to an English readership. WE originates from the independent and respected Netherlands-based publishing house De Geus that was founded in 1983 by Eric Visser, founder and publisher of WE.

History 
World Editions promotes voices from around the globe by publishing books from many different countries and languages into English translation. Through our work, we aim to enhance dialogue between cultures, foster new connections, and open doors which may otherwise have remained closed.

World Editions was founded in 2013 by Eric Visser, publisher of Dutch literary house De Geus―home to many Nobel Prize-winning authors. Since 2016, World Editions has been part of the independent Libella Group, a European publisher with bases in Switzerland, France, and Poland, led by the renowned Vera Michalski. Judith Uyterlinde, Publishing Director of World Editions since 2017, is passionate about literature and languages, and dedicated to bringing attention to outstanding writers from around the world. Today World Editions has offices in New York, London, and Amsterdam, after successfully launching in the US in March 2018.

World Editions publishes long-established authors, such as recent winner of the Alternative Nobel Prize, Maryse Condé, and the internationally acclaimed Paolo Maurensig, alongside promising debut novelists, such as rising stars Adeline Dieudonné and Pierre Jarawan.

World Editions was officially launched in January 2015. The first titles were Craving by Esther Gerritsen translated by Michele Hutchison, Gliding Flight by Anne-Gine Goemans translated by Nancy Forest-Flier, and Saturday’s Shadows by Ayesha Harruna Attah. In 2015, World Editions published books translated from the Dutch, Swedish, Icelandic, Russian, Norwegian, and Chinese. In 2016, Turkish, Italian, French, and Spanish were added to the list.

Non-translated titles 
Though the focus is on translations, World Editions also publishes novels that were originally written in English. In September 2018, World Editions published the powerful and intimate memoir Always Another Country by Sisonke Msimang; a book that has received enthusiastic reviews from both US and UK press. In 2016, World Editions published four Carol Shields novels: The Stone Diaries, Happenstance, Mary Swann, and The Republic of Love. These will be the first republications from the publisher.

Design of books 
Tessa van der Waals (Netherlands) is responsible for the cover design, cover typography, and art direction of all World Editions books. She works in the internationally renowned tradition of Dutch Design. Her bright and powerful visual aesthetic maintains a harmony between image and typography, and captures the unique atmosphere of each book. She works closely with internationally celebrated photographers, artists, and letter designers. Her work has frequently been awarded prizes for Best Dutch Book Design.

World Editions covers are edited by lithographer Bert van der Horst of BFC Graphics (Netherlands).

Suzan Beijer (Netherlands) is responsible for the typography and careful interior book design of all World Editions titles.

The text on the inside covers and the press quotes are set in Circular, designed by Laurenz Brunner (Switzerland) and published by Swiss type foundry Lineto.

All World Editions books are set in the typeface Dolly, specifically designed for book typography. Dolly creates a warm page image perfect for an enjoyable reading experience. This typeface is designed by Underware, a European collective formed by Bas Jacobs (Netherlands), Akiem Helmling (Germany), and Sami Kortemäki (Finland). Underware are also the creators of the World Editions logo, which meets the design requirement that ‘a strong shape can always be drawn with a toe in the sand.’

External links 
 
 World Editions scoops two from 'Alternative Nobel' winner Maryse Condé | The Bookseller
 Memoir of 'soul and survival' to World Editions | The Bookseller
 'Enthralling' story about family secrets to World Editions | The Bookseller
 World Editions to reissue Carol Shields’ backlist | The Bookseller
 Visser of De Geus launches English language publisher | The Bookseller

World Editions authors  
 Héctor Abad
 Maryse Conde
 Amin Maalouf
 Paolo Maurensig
 Sisonke Msimang
 Mia Couto
 Benoîte Groult
 Adeline Dieudonné
 Pierre Jarawan
 Frédéric Beigbeder
 Esther Gerritsen
 Jaap Robben
 Tatiana de Rosnay
 Johannes Anyuru
 Linda Boström Knausgård
 Renate Dorrestein
 Kristien Hemmerechts
 Michael Kaufman
 Li Kotomi
 Tom Lanoye
 Håkan Nesser
 Carol Shields
 Charles den Tex
 Annelies Verbeke
 Saskia de Coster
 Marente de Moor
 Pilar Quintana
 Preeta Samarasan
 Zhang Yueran

World Editions translators  
 Anne McLean
 Frank Wynne
 David Doherty
 Martin Aitken
 Anne Milano Appel
 Roland Glasser
 Jonathan Reeder
 Michele Hutchison
 Saskia Vogel
 Rosalind Harvey
 Sinéad Crowe
 Rachel McNicholl
 Vivien D. Glass
 Paul Vincent
 Liz Waters
 David Brookshaw
 Lisa Dillman
 Rachel Willson-Broyles
 Nancy Forest-Flier
 Philip Boehm
 Hester Velmans
 Natasha Lehrer
 Mo Teitelbaum
 Richard Philcox

Publishing companies established in 1983
Publishing companies based in London
Dutch literature
Dutch companies established in 2013